The 1916 New Jersey gubernatorial election was held on November 7, 1916. Republican nominee Walter Evans Edge defeated Democratic nominee H. Otto Wittpenn with 55.44% of the vote.

Democratic primary

Candidates
H. Otto Wittpenn, former Mayor of Jersey City

Results
Wittpenn was unopposed for the Democratic nomination.

Republican primary

Candidates
Austen Colgate, former State Senator from Essex County
Walter Evans Edge, State Senator from Atlantic County
George L. Record, attorney and perennial candidate from Jersey City

Results

General election

Candidates
John C. Butterworth (Socialist Labor)
Walter Evans Edge, State Senator from Atlantic County (Republican)
Frederick Krafft, business manager of the New Yorker Volkszeitung (Socialist)
Harry Vaughan (Prohibition)
H. Otto Wittpenn, former Mayor of Jersey City (Democratic)

Results

References

1919
New Jersey
Gubernatorial
November 1916 events